The 2007 Kansas City Wizards season was the 12th for the club in Major League Soccer. The Wizards finished fifth in the Eastern Conference and eighth overall with 40 points (11W 12L 7D), their best points total since 2004 and, resultantly, as an Eastern Conference team.

Curt Onalfo took over as manager this season. The club also acquired Kevin Hartman from the LA Galaxy, where the goalkeeper had made a name for himself in the league. For Kansas City, 2007 was mostly defined on-field by Eddie Johnson, who scored 15 league goals including back to back hat tricks to end May and begin June, a feat never before accomplished in the league. Johnson's achievements would be overshadowed by the overall chaos of the 2007 MLS season which included the introduction of the Designated Player Rule, enabling teams to sign far more prolific attackers than previous seasons. Despite Johnson's stellar play and the improvement of the Wizards (who made their first playoff as an Eastern team and lost the re-classified Western Conference Finals to eventual champions Houston Dynamo), more high-profile forwards such as DPs Luciano Emilio and Juan Pablo Ángel were given MLS Best XI consideration over the USMNT player.

This was the last season the Wizards played all their home matches at Arrowhead Stadium, as new ownership began a process of relocation and rebranding that would end up with the club opening its own new stadium in 2011.

Squad

Competitions

Major League Soccer

U.S. Open Cup qualification

MLS Cup Playoffs

Squad statistics

Final Statistics

References

Sporting Kansas City seasons
Kansas City Wizards
Kan
Kansas City Wizards